In mathematics, a permutation group G acting on a non-empty finite set X is called primitive if G acts transitively on X and the only partitions the G-action preserves are the trivial partitions into either a single set or into |X| singleton sets. Otherwise, if G is transitive and G does preserve a nontrivial partition, G is called imprimitive. 

While primitive permutation groups are transitive, not all transitive permutation groups are primitive. The simplest example is the Klein four-group acting on the vertices of a square, which preserves the partition into diagonals. On the other hand, if a permutation group preserves only trivial partitions, it is transitive, except in the case of the trivial group acting on a 2-element set. This is because for a non-transitive action, either the orbits of G form a nontrivial partition preserved by G, or the group action is trivial, in which case all nontrivial partitions of X (which exists for |X| ≥ 3) are preserved by G.

This terminology was introduced by Évariste Galois in his last letter, in which he used the French term équation primitive for an equation whose Galois group is primitive.

Properties

In the same letter in which he introduced the term "primitive", Galois stated the following theorem:If G is a primitive solvable group acting on a finite set X, then the order of X is a power of a prime number p. Further, X may be identified with an affine space over the finite field with p elements, and G acts on X as a subgroup of the affine group.If the set X on which G acts is finite, its cardinality is called the degree of G.

It follows that, if  is a prime number greater than 3, the symmetric group and the alternating group of degree  are not solvable, since their order are greater than  Abel–Ruffini theorem results from this and the fact that there are polynomials with a symmetric Galois group.

An equivalent definition of primitivity relies on the fact that every transitive action of a group G is isomorphic to an action arising from the canonical action of G on the set G/H of cosets for H a subgroup of G.  A group action is primitive if it is isomorphic to G/H for a maximal subgroup H of G, and imprimitive otherwise (that is, if there is a proper subgroup K of G of which H is a proper subgroup).  These imprimitive actions are examples of induced representations. 

The numbers of primitive groups of small degree were stated by Robert Carmichael in 1937:

There are a large number of primitive groups of degree 16.  As Carmichael notes, all of these groups, except for the symmetric and alternating group, are subgroups of the affine group on the 4-dimensional space over the 2-element finite field.

Examples 
 Consider the symmetric group  acting on the set  and the permutation 
 
 Now consider the symmetric group  acting on the set  and the permutation 
 
 Every transitive group of prime degree is primitive
 The symmetric group  acting on the set  is primitive for every n and the alternating group  acting on the set  is primitive for every n > 2.

See also 
 Block (permutation group theory)
 Jordan's theorem (symmetric group)
 O'Nan–Scott theorem, a classification of finite primitive groups into various types

References 

 Roney-Dougal, Colva M. The primitive permutation groups of degree less than 2500, Journal of Algebra 292 (2005), no. 1, 154–183. 
 The GAP Data Library "Primitive Permutation Groups".
 Carmichael, Robert D., Introduction to the Theory of Groups of Finite  Order. Ginn, Boston, 1937.  Reprinted by Dover Publications, New York, 1956.

Permutation groups
Integer sequences